The Fort Niobrara Wilderness is located in the U.S. state of Nebraska, near Valentine. Created by an act of Congress in 1976, the wilderness is managed by the U.S. Fish and Wildlife Service and covers an area of 4,635 acres (18.75 km2) within Fort Niobrara National Wildlife Refuge. The wilderness lies along the northern banks of the Niobrara River (which is designated as the Niobrara National Scenic River through the refuge and beyond), providing sanctuary to bison, prairie dogs, mule deer, river otter and the bald eagle. A mixture of flat prairie and wooded ravines, there are no maintained trails in the wilderness. Access is only allowed during daylight hours and there is no camping or fires allowed, although one can do so outside the wilderness in the remaining sections of the refuge. Additionally, no hunting is allowed in this wilderness.

U.S. Wilderness Areas do not allow motorized or mechanized vehicles, including bicycles. Although camping and fishing are allowed with a proper permit, no roads or buildings are constructed and there is also no logging or mining, in compliance with the 1964 Wilderness Act. Wilderness areas within National Forests and Bureau of Land Management areas also allow hunting (in season).

See also
 List of U.S. Wilderness Areas
 Wilderness Act
 Fort Niobrara

External links
 
 
 

Protected areas of Cherry County, Nebraska
IUCN Category Ib
Wilderness areas of Nebraska